The 2016 FC Goa season was the club's third season since its establishment in 2014 and their third season in the Indian Super League.

Background

After retaining Brazilian head coach, Zico, as well as the core Indian players from the 2014 season such as Romeo Fernandes, Mandar Rao Desai, Narayan Das, and Laxmikant Kattimani, Goa began the season in good fashion with a 2–0 victory at home against Delhi Dynamos. Goa went on the finish the regular season in first place, winning seven of their fourteen games, losing only once in the second half of the season. In the finals, Goa took on Delhi Dynamos in the semi-finals. After losing the away leg 1–0, Goa qualified for the final after winning the home leg 3–0. Goals from Jofre, Rafael Coelho, and Dudu Omagbemi, saw Goa win on aggregate 3–1.

Goa took on Chennaiyin in the final at the Fatorda Stadium. Bruno Pelissari gave Chennaiyin the lead in the 54th minute after missing his penalty before Goa took a 2–1 going into stoppage time through Thongkhosiem Haokip and Jofre. However, an own goal from Kattimani and a strike from Stiven Mendoza saw Chennaiyin win the match 3–2 and win the championship.

Season overview 
FC Goa played their first match on 4 October 2016 against NorthEast United FC and succumbed a 2–0 away defeat in Guwahati. Four days later, Goa lost their first home match of the season against FC Pune City after Momar Ndoye scored at the 90th-minute winner to give them a 1–2 victory.

Pre Season Friendly

Player movement

Retained players

Signings

In

Indian Super League

Results summary

Matches

Player statistics

See also
 2016–17 in Indian football

References

FC Goa seasons
Goa